The 2009 Men's EuroHockey Nations Challenge I was the third edition of the Men's EuroHockey Nations Challenge I, the third level of the European field hockey Championships organized by the European Hockey Federation. It was held from 25 to 31 July 2009 in Zagreb, Croatia.

The tournament also served as a qualifier for the 2011 Men's EuroHockey Championship II, with the finalists, Ukraine and Sweden, qualifying.

Qualified teams
The following seven teams, shown with pre-tournament world rankings, competed in the tournament.

Results
''All times are local (UTC+2).

Preliminary round

Pool A

Pool B

Fifth to seventh place classification

Pool C
The points obtained in the preliminary round against the other team are taken over.

First to fourth place classification

Semi-finals

Third place game

Final

Final standings

 Promoted to the EuroHockey Championship II

See also
2009 Men's EuroHockey Nations Challenge II
2009 Men's EuroHockey Nations Trophy

References

EuroHockey Championship III
International field hockey competitions hosted by Croatia
Men 3
EuroHockey  Nations Challenge I
EuroHockey  Nations Challenge I
Sports competitions in Zagreb
2000s in Zagreb